Delta Sigma Xi, Inc. (also Delta Sigma Xi) is a confraternity that was established at the Manuel Luis Quezon University (MLQU), Philippines in 1971. Built on the idea of brotherhood or unity, its numbers and boundaries soon grew. Soon, chapters were formed at other major universities and schools all over the three major islands of the Philippines and outside of the country.

The fraternity is registered with the Securities and Exchange Commission (Philippines) as a non-profit and non-dividend Corporation.

History
It started in the Philippines on February 14, 1971. A group of students built this confraternity to utilised tools to help out people to speak out 
and the right to questions the administration of late President Ferdinand Marcos. But those individual students didn't condemned any violent or didn't choose any political views. The purpose was to voice out and help people to express freedom of speech. They have used the newspaper article to lay out the messages of what the people want to say.

But then, due to many on unprovoked protest and propaganda made by unsupportive parties against the government. President Ferdinand Marcos declared Martial Law that caused many Filipino people to join a massive protest. And Malacanang Palace put the whole country on a full lock down. In that year, massive riots and violence protest sparks on the street of Manila.

In that year of era, the Delta Sigma Xi was initially born and formed in the school of Manuel L. Quezon University. Delta Sigma Xi spread around the Philippines into different places such as Metro Manila, Ilocos Norte, Baguio, Zambales, Visayas and Mindanao.

References

External links
Delta Sigma Xi National Chapter
Delta Sigma Xi International Chapter

Fraternities and sororities in the Philippines
Student organizations established in 1971
1971 establishments in the Philippines